Markt Hartmannsdorf is a municipality in the district of Weiz in the Austrian state of Styria.

References

Cities and towns in Weiz District